Danilo is a village near Šibenik, Croatia, population 376 (census 2011).

It is the eponym site of the Neolithic Danilo culture.

References

Populated places in Šibenik-Knin County
Archaeological sites in Croatia